Shihezi is a sub-prefecture-level city in Northern Xinjiang, People's Republic of China. It has a population of 380,130 according to the 2010 census. The city is also home to Shihezi University, the second-largest comprehensive university under the Project 211 in Xinjiang.

History
In 1951, General Wang Zhen decided to build a new base for the People's Liberation Army and selected the location of current Shihezi. Zhao Xiguang (赵锡光) took charge in the development of the city, and established the Xinjiang Production and Construction Corps in 1954.

Quasimilitary-structured farms surrounding Shihezi fueled the development of the city by producing materials for the factories that have been the economic drivers of the city. In 1974, Shihezi became a city.

Demographics

Economy

Nowadays textile and food industries are the most important in Shihezi. The railway to Wusu and Ürümqi skirts the city, while a United Nations economic development project provided a high-quality highway system for the city. The textile industry is the primary employer, although the international trade environment on textiles has brought in fluctuations in employment. As a hub to surrounding farms, the city's destiny is currently tied with theirs. Sugar beets are cultivated near Shihezi. Cultivation of cotton in the farms was accelerated in the 1990s and now dominates the economy.

Shihezi is also home to a polysilicon factory of Daqo New Energy Corp., one of the largest polysilicon producers in the world.

Geography and climate

Although Shihezi is almost surrounded on the east, west and north by the Changji Hui Autonomous Prefecture (which also includes the city's eastern neighbor, the much older historically Hui town of Manas), it is not a part of it.

Located in an area further from the nearest seacoast than any other region on earth, Shihezi has a continental semi-arid climate (Köppen BSk), with a large temperature differences between summer and winter.

The Manas River forms the administrative border between Shihezi City and its eastern neighbor, Manas County. An extensive system of reservoirs (such as the Jiahezi Reservoir (with the dam at ) and irrigation canals has been constructed in the area, supporting irrigated agriculture.

Education

Shihezi University is located in Shihezi. It is the second-largest university in Xinjiang, with approximately 40,000 students.

Transport
Shihezi is served by China National Highway 312, the Northern Xinjiang and the Second Ürümqi-Jinghe Railways. Reconstruction of the Shihezi Huayuan Airport began in May 2012 and it reopened on 26 December 2015.

References

External links

Shihezi economic development zone 
Shihezi party politics public information network 
Map of the City of Shihezi 
Shihezi a 'Shining Pearl in the Gobi Desert' 
Shihezi (China) -- Britannica Online Encyclopedia

 
Populated places in Xinjiang
National Forest Cities in China
Xinjiang Production and Construction Corps
Socialist planned cities
County-level divisions of Xinjiang